Lawn bowls at the 1999 Southeast Asian Games took place in the Hassanal Bolkiah National Stadium in Bandar Seri Begawan, Brunei from 7 to 15 August 1999.

Medal table

Medalists

Men

Women

References

1999 Southeast Asian Games